Deferiprone, sold under the brand name Ferriprox among others, is a medication that chelates iron and is used to treat iron overload in thalassaemia major.  It was first approved and indicated for use in treating thalassaemia major in 1994 and had been licensed for use in the European Union for many years while awaiting approval in Canada and in the United States. On October 14, 2011, it was approved for use in the US under the FDA's accelerated approval program.

The most common side effects include red-brown urine (showing that iron is being removed through the urine), nausea (feeling sick), abdominal pain (stomach ache) and vomiting. Less common but more serious side effects are agranulocytosis (very low levels of granulocytes, a type of white blood cell) and neutropenia (low levels of neutrophils, a type of white blood cell that fights infections).

Medical uses 
Deferiprone monotherapy is indicated in the European Union for the treatment of iron overload in those with thalassaemia major when current chelation therapy is contraindicated or inadequate.

Deferiprone in combination with another chelator is indicated in the European Union in those with thalassaemia major when monotherapy with any iron chelator is ineffective, or when prevention or treatment of life-threatening consequences of iron overload (mainly cardiac overload) justifies rapid or intensive correction.

Controversy
Deferiprone was at the center of a protracted struggle between Nancy Olivieri, a Canadian haematologist and researcher, and the Hospital for Sick Children and the pharmaceutical company Apotex, that started in 1996, and delayed approval of the drug in North America. Olivieri's data suggested deferiprone leads to progressive hepatic fibrosis.

History 
Deferiprone was approved for medical use in the European Union in August 1999.

It was approved for medical use in the United States in October 2011. Generic versions were approved in August 2019.

The safety and effectiveness of deferiprone is based on an analysis of data from twelve clinical studies in 236 participants. Participants in the study did not respond to prior iron chelation therapy. Deferiprone was considered a successful treatment for participants who experienced at least a 20 percent decrease in serum ferritin, a protein that stores iron in the body for later use. Half of the participants in the study experienced at least a 20 percent decrease in ferritin levels.

References

External links 
 

Chelating agents
Chelating agents used as drugs
Antidotes
4-Pyridones